Fiore is a 2016 Italian drama film directed by Claudio Giovannesi. It was screened in the Directors' Fortnight section at the 2016 Cannes Film Festival.

Cast
 Daphne Scoccia
 Josciua Algeri
 Valerio Mastandrea
 Laura Vasiliu
 Aniello Arena

References

External links
 

2016 films
2016 drama films
Italian drama films
2010s Italian-language films
2010s Italian films